Paul Lodewijkx (9 January 1947 – 10 August 1988) was a Dutch professional Grand Prix motorcycle road racer. He had his best year in 1968 when he won the Dutch TT on a hometown  bike, built by his friends, and finished the season in second place behind Hans-Georg Anscheidt (riding for the Suzuki team). He was the first Dutchman to win his home Grand Prix.

In 1969 he had a traffic accident on his motorbike. After a long recovery, he was left with occasional epileptic seizures and his return in 1972 was unsuccessful. His new hobby became nature preservation and photography. An epileptic seizure caused his death by drowning in 1988.

References 

1947 births
1988 deaths
Dutch motorcycle racers
50cc World Championship riders
People from Wijdemeren
Deaths by drowning
Sportspeople from North Holland
20th-century Dutch people